State Route 211 (SR 211) is a  secondary state route in Dyer County, Tennessee, United States, that previously extended north into Obion County. SR 211 is a two-lane highway throughout its length except for a short section in northern Dyersburg.

Route description
The southern terminus of SR 211 is at a large 3-way junction with US 51 / SR 3 just south southern Dyersburg. SR 211 begins as an unsigned route concurrent with US 51 Business inside the city limits of Dyersburg. SR 211 briefly overlaps with SR 104 near downtown Dyersburg and with US 51 on the north side of the city. North of Dyersburg, SR 211 is constructed as a two-lane route and is predominantly rural in nature. This route passes through downtown Newbern and intersects SR 77 before continuing north toward Trimble. The northern terminus of SR 211 is at Trimble at a 4-way at-grade intersection with SR 105. North of this intersection, old SR 211 continues north but is closed to traffic. This old alignment provides access to the C.M. Gooch Wildlife Management Area maintained by the Tennessee Wildlife Resources Agency.

History
SR 211 is part of an older alignment of US 51 and SR 3.

In the past, SR 211 continued north past Trimble with a historic northern terminus at the US 51 freeway just south of Troy. Tennessee Department of Transportation ended state maintenance on the section of this highway between Trimble and Obion due to the deteriorated nature of the bridges along this section of roadway and the derelict Adkison Memorial Bridge over the Obion River that has been closed for a number of years.  This orphaned northern portion of SR 211 was eventually deleted and resigned as an extended SR 183. This highway represents the old two-lane alignment of US 51 between Dyersburg and Troy. North of Troy the old two-lane alignment of US 51 resumes and is currently signed as SR 184 and runs to Union City.

County maps published by TDOT do not show the recent realignment of this highway, however, the Official Transportation Map and signs erected in the field reflect the change as stated above.  For several years, SR 211 was detoured off its alignment using SR 105, US 51, and SR 183 to avoid the closed section of roadway roughly from the Obion County line at Trimble north to Obion. The detour around this section of highway was removed when SR 211 was truncated to SR 105.

Major intersections

See also

 List of highways numbered 211

References

External links

 Tennessee Department of Transportation

211
U.S. Route 51
Transportation in Dyer County, Tennessee